Nebria mandibalaris is a species of ground beetle in the Nebriinae subfamily that is endemic to Turkey.

References

mandibalaris
Beetles described in 1872
Beetles of Asia
Endemic fauna of Turkey